Scalidognathus oreophilus, is a species of spider of the genus Scalidognathus. It is endemic to Sri Lanka.

See also
 List of Idiopidae species

References

Spiders described in 1892
Idiopidae
Endemic fauna of Sri Lanka
Spiders of Asia